Mancieulles is a former commune in the Meurthe-et-Moselle department in north-eastern France. On 1 January 2017, it was merged into the new commune Val de Briey. Its population was 1,843 in 2019.

See also
Communes of the Meurthe-et-Moselle department

References 

Former communes of Meurthe-et-Moselle